Television Hill may refer to:
 Television Hill, a hill and neighborhood in Woodberry, Baltimore, a neighborhood in northwest Baltimore, Maryland
 Television Hill (band), an American folk rock band from Baltimore
 Television Hill, Pittsburgh, a hill and street on the north of Pittsburgh, Pennsylvania